Margaret Plantagenet, Countess of Salisbury (14 August 1473 – 28 May 1541), also called Margaret Pole, as a result of her marriage to Sir Richard Pole, was the only surviving daughter of George Plantagenet, Duke of Clarence, a brother of Kings Edward IV and Richard III (all sons of Richard Plantagenet, 3rd Duke of York), by his wife Isabel Neville. Margaret was one of just two women in 16th-century England to be a peeress in her own right (suo jure) without a husband in the House of Lords. As one of the few members of the House of Plantagenet to have survived the Wars of the Roses, she was executed in 1541 at the command of King Henry VIII, the second monarch of the House of Tudor, who was the son of her first cousin, Elizabeth of York. Pope Leo XIII beatified her as a martyr for the Roman Catholic Church on 29 December 1886.

Early life

Margaret was born at Farleigh Castle in Somerset, the only surviving daughter of George Plantagenet, Duke of Clarence, and his wife Isabel Neville, who was the elder daughter of Richard Neville, 16th Earl of Warwick, and his wife Anne Beauchamp, 16th Countess of Warwick. Her maternal grandfather was killed fighting against her uncle, Edward IV, at the Battle of Barnet. Her father, already Duke of Clarence, was then created Earl of Salisbury and of Warwick. Edward IV declared that Margaret's younger brother, Edward, should be known as Earl of Warwick as a courtesy title, but no peerage was ever created for him. Margaret would have had a claim to the Earldom of Warwick, but the earldom was forfeited on the attainder of her brother Edward.

Margaret's mother died when she was three; her father had two servants killed when he thought they had poisoned her. The Duke of Clarence plotted against Edward IV and in February 1478 was attainted and executed for treason. His lands and titles were thereby forfeited. Edward IV died in 1483 when Margaret was ten. The next year, the late king's marriage was declared invalid by the statute Titulus Regius of 1484, making his children illegitimate. Since Margaret and her brother, Edward, were debarred from the throne by their father's attainder, their uncle, Richard, Duke of Gloucester, was offered the crown and became king as Richard III. He married Anne Neville, a younger sister of Margaret's mother, Isabel.

Richard III sent the children to Sheriff Hutton Castle in Yorkshire. In 1485, he was defeated and killed at the Battle of Bosworth by Henry Tudor, who succeeded him as Henry VII. The new king married Margaret's cousin, Elizabeth of York, Edward IV's daughter, and Margaret and her brother were taken into their care. Soon, young Edward, a potential York claimant to the throne, was moved to the Tower of London. Edward was briefly displayed in public at St Paul's Cathedral in 1487 in response to the presentation of the impostor Lambert Simnel as the "Earl of Warwick" to the Irish lords.

Shortly thereafter, (probably in November 1487) Henry VII gave Margaret in marriage to his cousin, Sir Richard Pole, whose mother was a half-sister of the king's mother, Margaret Beaufort. When Perkin Warbeck impersonated Edward IV's presumed-dead son, Richard of Shrewsbury, 1st Duke of York, in 1499, Margaret's brother Edward was attainted and executed for involvement in the plot.

Richard Pole held a variety of offices in Henry VII's government, the highest being Chamberlain for Arthur, Prince of Wales, Henry's elder son. When Arthur married Catherine of Aragon, Margaret became one of her ladies-in-waiting, but her entourage was dissolved when Arthur died in 1502 aged fifteen.

When her husband died in 1505, Margaret became a widow with five children. She had a small estate of land, inherited from her husband, but no other income and no prospects. Henry VII paid for Richard's funeral. To ease the situation, Margaret devoted her third son, Reginald Pole, to the Church; he was to have an eventful career as a papal Legate and later as Archbishop of Canterbury. Later in life, he bitterly resented her abandonment of him. After her husband's death, Margaret had such inadequate means to support herself and her children that she was forced to live at Syon Abbey as the guest of the Bridgettine nuns. She remained there until she returned to favour when Henry VIII came to the throne in 1509.

Countess of Salisbury
Henry VIII married Catherine of Aragon in 1509 and Margaret was again appointed as one of her ladies-in-waiting. In 1512, an Act of Parliament restored to Margaret the Earldom of Salisbury and some of her brother's land which had belonged to it, for which she paid 5000 marks (£2666.13s.4d), . Henry VII had controlled them first while her brother was a minor and then during his imprisonment; he later confiscated them after his trial. However, her brother's Warwick and Spencer [Despencer] estates remained in the hands of the crown.

As Countess of Salisbury, Margaret managed her lands well and by 1538 she was the fifth richest peer in England. She was a patron of the New Learning, like many Renaissance noblewomen; Gentian Hervet had translated Erasmus' de immensa misericordia Dei (The Great Mercy of God) into English for her. Her first son, Henry Pole, was created Baron Montagu, another of the Neville titles, speaking for the family in the House of Lords. Her second son, Arthur Pole, had a generally successful career as a courtier, becoming one of the six Gentlemen of the Privy Chamber.

Arthur Pole suffered a setback when his patron Edward Stafford, 3rd Duke of Buckingham, was convicted of treason in 1521, but he was soon restored to favour. He died young (about 1526) having married the heir of Roger Lewknor. Margaret and her son, Henry, pressed Arthur's widow to take a vow of perpetual chastity to preserve her inheritance for her Pole children. Her daughter Ursula married the Duke of Buckingham's son, Henry Stafford, but after the Duke's fall, the couple were given only fragments of his estates.

Margaret's third son, Reginald Pole, studied abroad in Padua. He was Dean of Exeter and Wimborne Minster, Dorset, as well as a canon of York. He had several other livings, although he had not been ordained a priest. In 1529, he represented Henry VIII in Paris, persuading the theologians of the Sorbonne to support Henry's divorce from Catherine of Aragon. Her youngest son, Geoffrey Pole, married well to Constance, daughter of Edmund Pakenham, and inherited the estate of Lordington in Sussex.

Margaret's own favour at Court varied. She had a dispute over land with Henry VIII in 1518; he awarded the contested lands to the Dukedom of Somerset, which had been held by his Beaufort great-grandfather, and were now in the possession of the Crown. In 1520 Margaret was appointed governess to Henry's daughter Mary. The next year, when her sons were mixed up with Buckingham, she was removed from that appointment, but later restored to it by 1525.

When Mary was declared a bastard in 1533, Margaret refused to give Mary's gold plate and jewels back to Henry. Mary's household was broken up at the end of the year, and Margaret asked to serve Mary at her own cost, but was not permitted. The Imperial Ambassador, Eustace Chapuys, suggested two years later that Mary be handed over to Margaret, but Henry refused, calling her "a fool, of no experience".

Fall
In 1531, Reginald Pole warned of the dangers of the Boleyn marriage. He returned to Padua in 1532 and received a last English benefice in December of that same year. Chapuys suggested to Emperor Charles V that Reginald marry Mary and combine their dynastic claims. Chapuys also communicated with Reginald through his brother, Geoffrey. Reginald replied to books Henry sent him with his own pamphlet, pro ecclesiasticae unitatis defensione, or de unitate, which denied Henry's position on the marriage of a brother's wife and denied royal supremacy. Reginald also urged the princes of Europe to depose Henry immediately. Henry wrote to Margaret, who in turn wrote to her son, reproving him for his "folly". In May 1536, Reginald finally and definitively broke with the king. After Henry's second wife, Anne Boleyn, was arrested, and eventually executed, Margaret was permitted to return to Court, albeit briefly.

In 1537, Reginald (still not ordained) was made a Cardinal. Pope Paul III put him in charge of organising assistance for the Pilgrimage of Grace (and related movements). The pilgrimage was an effort to organize a march on London to install a conservative Catholic government instead of Henry's increasingly Protestant-leaning one. Neither Francis I of France nor the Emperor supported this effort and the English government tried to have Reginald assassinated. In 1539, Reginald was sent to the Emperor to organize an embargo against England—the sort of countermeasure he had himself warned Henry was possible.

As part of the investigations into the so-called Exeter Conspiracy, Geoffrey Pole was arrested in August 1538. Gregory had been corresponding with Reginald; the investigation of Henry Courtenay, Marquess of Exeter (Henry VIII's first cousin and Geoffrey's second cousin), had turned up his name. Geoffrey appealed to Thomas Cromwell, who had him arrested and interrogated. Under interrogation, Geoffrey said that his eldest brother, Lord Montagu, and the Marquess had been parties to his correspondence with Reginald. Montagu, Exeter, and Margaret were arrested in November 1538.

In January 1539 Geoffrey was pardoned, but Margaret's son, Henry, Baron Montagu (and cousin Exeter), were later executed for treason after trial. In May 1539 Henry, Margaret, Exeter and others were attainted, as Margaret's father had been. This conviction meant they lost their titles and their lands—mostly in the South of England—conveniently located to assist any invasion.

As part of the evidence for the bill of attainder, Cromwell produced a tunic bearing the Five Wounds of Christ, symbolizing Margaret's support for the Church of Rome and the rule of her son, Reginald, and the king's Roman Catholic daughter, Mary. The supposed discovery, six months after her house and effects were searched at her arrest, is likely to have been a fabrication. She was sentenced to death, to be executed at the king's will.

Margaret Pole, as she was now styled, was held in the Tower of London for two-and-a-half years. She, her grandson, Henry (son of her own son Henry), and Exeter's son were held together and supported by the king. She was attended by servants and received an extensive grant of clothing in March 1541. In 1540, Cromwell fell from favour and was attainted and executed.

Execution 
The following poem was found carved on the wall of her cell:

On the morning of 28 May 1541, Margaret was told she was to die within the hour. She answered that no crime had been imputed to her. Nevertheless, she was taken from her cell to the place within the precincts of the Tower of London where a low wooden block had been prepared instead of the customary scaffold.

Two written eyewitness reports survived her execution: one by Marillac, the French ambassador, and the other by Chapuys, ambassador to the Holy Roman Emperor. The accounts differ slightly; Marillac's report, dispatched two days afterwards, recorded that the execution took place in a corner of the Tower with so few people present that, in the evening, news of her execution was doubted. Chapuys wrote two weeks after the execution that one hundred and fifty witnesses were present for the execution, including the Lord Mayor of London.

Chapuys wrote that, "at first, when the sentence of death was made known to her, she found the thing very strange, not knowing of what crime she was accused, nor how she had been sentenced". Because the main executioner had been sent north to deal with rebels, the execution was performed by "a wretched and blundering youth who literally hacked her head and shoulders to pieces in the most pitiful manner".

A third account in Burke's Peerage, possibly apocryphal, described the appalling circumstances of the execution. It states that Margaret refused to lay her head on the block, declaiming, "So should traitors do, and I am none". According to the account, she turned her head "every which way", instructing the executioner that, if he wanted her head, he should take it as he could. Margaret was buried in the chapel of St Peter ad Vincula within the Tower of London. Her remains were later uncovered when the chapel was renovated in 1876.

Descendants
When not at Court, Margaret lived chiefly at Warblington Castle in Hampshire and Bisham Manor in Berkshire. She and her husband were parents to five children:
 Henry Pole, 1st Baron Montagu (c. 14929 January 1539), notable as one of the peers in the trial of Anne Boleyn; married Jane Neville, daughter of George Nevill, 5th Baron Bergavenny, and Joan Fitzalan, with whom he had four children; beheaded by order of Henry VIII. A great-grandson of Henry Pole was Sir John Bourchier, one of the regicides of Charles I of England, who was a great-great-grandnephew of Henry VIII.
 Arthur Pole (before 1499before 1532), Lord of the Manor of Broadhurst in Sussex; married Jane Lewkenor, daughter of Sir Roger Lewkenor and the former Eleanor Tuchet, herself daughter of the 6th Baron Audley and the former Anne Echingham. They had four children.
 Reginald Pole (c. 150017 November 1558), cardinal, papal legate in various regions, including England, and the last Catholic Archbishop of Canterbury.
 Geoffrey Pole (c. 1501–1558), Lord of the Manor of Lordington in Sussex, suspected of treason by King Henry VIII and accused of conspiring with Charles V, Holy Roman Emperor; lived in exile in Europe; married Constance Pakenham, granddaughter and heir of Sir John Pakenham. John Pakenham was an ancestor to Sir Edward Pakenham, brother-in-law to the Duke of Wellington.
 Ursula Pole (c. 150412 August 1570), married Henry Stafford, 1st Baron Stafford, and had some fourteen children.

Legacy 

Her son, Reginald Pole, said that he would "never fear to call himself the son of a martyr". She was later regarded by Catholics as such and was beatified on 29 December 1886 by Pope Leo XIII. She is commemorated in the dedication of the Church of Our Lady Queen of Peace & Blessed Margaret Pole in Southbourne, Bournemouth.

There are panel paintings of Pole in the following churches:

 English Martyrs Church, Preston (she is on the right.)
 St Joseph's Church in Sale, Cheshire
 St. Marie's Church in New Bilton, Rugby, England

There are stained glass windows of Pole in the following churches:

 Our Lady of Lourdes in Harpenden, Hertfordshire.
 St. Osmund's Church in Salisbury
 St. Mary's Roman Catholic Church in Bridge Gate, Derby
 Our Lady and the English Martyrs' church in Cambridge (and another one from the right)
 Shrewsbury Cathedral, she is in the fourth window in front of John Fisher.

Cultural depictions
 Margaret appears in William Shakespeare's 16th-century play Richard III as the young daughter of the murdered Duke of Clarence.
 The character of Lady Salisbury in the Showtime series The Tudors, played by Kate O'Toole in 2007 and 2009, is loosely based on Margaret Pole.
 Janet Henfrey portrays Margaret in Episode 4 ("The Devil's Spit") of Wolf Hall, the 2015 BBC adaptation of Hilary Mantel's novels Wolf Hall (2009) and Bring Up the Bodies (2012).
 Margaret is the main character of Philippa Gregory's 2014 novel The King's Curse. She also appears in Gregory's novels The Kingmaker's Daughter (2012) and The White Princess (2013).
 Margaret was portrayed by Rebecca Benson in the television adaptation of The White Princess and by Laura Carmichael in the miniseries The Spanish Princess, a sequel to The White Princess.
 Margaret is the main character of Samantha Wilcoxson's 2016 novel, Faithful Traitor.

Notes

Sources
 Dwyer, J.G. "Pole, Margaret Plantagenet, Bl." at New Catholic Encyclopedia. 2nd ed. Vol. 11. Detroit: Gale, 2003. pp. 455–456. Cited as New Catholic Encyclopedia.
 Mayer, T.F. Pole, Reginald (1500–1558), Oxford Dictionary of National Biography, Oxford University Press, 2004; online edn, Jan 2008, cited as ODNB, Reginald Pole.
 
 ; cited as ODNB.

Further reading
 Pierce, Hazel (2003). Margaret Pole, Countess of Salisbury, 1473–1541: Loyalty, Lineage and Leadership, University of Wales Press,

External links 

|-

1473 births
1541 deaths
16th-century Roman Catholic martyrs
English beatified people
Pole
Executed English women
Margaret
Executed royalty
People convicted under a bill of attainder
Executions at the Tower of London
Daughters of English dukes
Wives of knights
Margaret Pole, Countess of Salisbury
Executed people from Somerset
People executed under Henry VIII
Pole, Margaret
Prisoners in the Tower of London
16th-century English nobility
15th-century English nobility
15th-century English women
16th-century English women
People from the Borough of Havant
People from Bisham
People from Mendip District
People executed by Tudor England by decapitation
People executed under the Tudors for treason against England
Burials at the Church of St Peter ad Vincula
Roman Catholic royal saints
Governesses to the English Royal Household
English ladies-in-waiting
Forty-one Martyrs of England and Wales
Household of Catherine of Aragon
Barons Monthermer
Barons Montagu
Hereditary peeresses created by Henry VIII